Calamotropha subalcesta is a moth in the family Crambidae. It was described by Stanisław Błeszyński in 1961. It is found in Taiwan.

References

Crambinae
Moths described in 1961